Frédéric Brun (born 15 September 1957) is a former French racing cyclist. He rode in twelve Grand Tours between 1980 and 1991. He rode the 1990 Giro d'Italia, the Vuelta a Espana in  1985 and  1991 and for the Tour de France he rode in  1980, each year between  1982 and  1988 as well as 1990. He had three top 10 stage finishes, two in 1984 and one in 1987. He finished every Grand Tour that he started.

References

External links
 

1957 births
Living people
French male cyclists
Sportspeople from Dordogne
Cyclists from Nouvelle-Aquitaine